Nadhim Kzar was the first head of the Iraqi Directorate of General Security.

History
He joined the Arab Socialist Ba'ath Party – Iraq Region in the 1950s as a student and was one of the first Shia to hold a position of power in the regime. He was briefly imprisoned by Abdul Salam Arif in 1964/5. In 1969 he was appointed head of Directorate of General Security.

He has been credited with invigorating an organisation that was failing after ten (1958–1968) years of army control yet he was despised for his sadism and his habit of conducting interrogations personally, usually involving torture. He is reputed to have personally beaten to death Islamic scholar and government opponent Abd al-Aziz al-Badri.

Attempted coup
In July 1973, allegedly motivated by the dominance of Sunnis in Iraq, he led an unsuccessful coup against President Ahmed Hassan al-Bakr. He took hostage the minister of interior Sa'adiun Gheidan and minister of defense Hamid Shehab. He had intended to assassinate Bakr when his plane landed in Baghdad, but the flight was late and the assassination attempt was aborted. He shot dead both ministers after his convoy was captured as he attempted to flee to Iran.

Execution
On July 7 he was tried over the coup by the Iraqi Revolutionary Command Council under Izzat Ibrahim al-Douri and executed that same month.

References

Iraqi Shia Muslims
20th-century executions by Iraq